A hermit is a person who lives in seclusion from society.

Hermit may also refer to

Geography
 Hermit Island (disambiguation)
 Hermit Islands, Bismarck Archipelago, Papua New Guinea
 Hermit Mountain, British Columbia, Canada
 Hermit Peak, New Mexico, United States
 Hermit Trail, a hiking trail in Grand Canyon National Park, Arizona
 The Hermit (California mountain), a summit in the Sierra Nevada

Arts and entertainment
 A Hermit, a 1661 painting by Gerrit Dou
 The Hermit (Il solitario), a 1908 painting by John Singer Sargent
 The Hermit (novel), a 1973 novel by Eugène Ionesco
 The Hermit (band), a Canadian electronica band
 The Hermit (album), a 1976 album by John Renbourn
 Hermit (album), a 1997 album by Ron "Bumblefoot" Thal
 The Hermit, a painting used on the inner sleeve of the 1971 Led Zeppelin album Led Zeppelin IV

Other uses
 Garden hermit, or ornamental hermit, a person invited to live as a hermit on a wealthy landowner's estate
 Hermit, a type of spiced cookie
 Hermit (horse) (1864–1890), English thoroughbred 
 Hermit (hummingbird), the hummingbird subfamily Phaethornithinae
 Hermit language, an extinct language that was spoken in Papua New Guinea
 The Hermit (tarot card), a trump card in tarot
 Hermit House, an example of vernacular architecture in Herzliya, Israel
 Hermit, a class in the online role-playing game MapleStory

See also 
 List of people known as the Hermit
 Hermit beetle, a species of European beetle Osmoderma eremita
 Hermit butterfly, the brush-footed butterfly Chazara briseis
 Hermit crab, a crustacean of the superfamily Paguroidea
 Drenthe hermits, seven people discovered in Ruinerwold
 Esther Hermitte, a social anthropologist from Argentina
 Herman's Hermits, an English pop band
 Hermit Formation, an American geologic formation
 Hermite (disambiguation)
 Hermitage (disambiguation)